Sobha City Mall is a shopping mall in Sobha City, Puzhakkal, Thrissur City, Kerala, India. The Mall opened on 17 December 2015. The mall is centrally air-conditioned and have a six screen multiplex by INOX Leisure Limited. It offers luxury business hotel, office space, restaurants, food courts and a 600 car parking facility.

See also
 Mall of Joy, Thrissur

References

Sobha city Gurgaon

Shopping malls in Thrissur
2015 establishments in Kerala
Buildings and structures in Thrissur
Shopping malls established in 2015